2. liga, currently named DOXXbet liga due to sponsorship reasons, is the second-highest division in the Slovak football league system after the Fortuna Liga. The 2014–15 season of the DOXXbet liga was [ok] the 22nd season of the second-tier football league in Slovakia, since its establishment in 1993.

For the first time in history, twenty-four teams will compete in two groups, with top six sides from each of groups will advance to a further round.

Changes from last season

Team changes
ŽP Šport Podbrezová were promoted to the Slovak First Football League after the 2013–14 season.
FC Nitra were relegated from the Slovak First Football League after the 2013–14 season.
MŠK Žilina B, ŠKF Sereď, MFK Skalica, AFC Nové Mesto nad Váhom, ŠK Slovan Bratislava B, TJ Baník Ružiná, MFK Dolný Kubín, FK Poprad, MFK Košice B, FK Bodva Moldava nad Bodvou, FC Lokomotíva Košice and FK Slavoj Trebišov were promoted from the Slovak Third Football League after the 2013–14 season.

Teams (Western Group)

Stadia and locations

Personnel and kits

2. Liga West

Teams (Eastern Group)

Stadium and locations

Personnel and kits

2. Liga East

Play-offs

Championship round

League table

Relegation round

League table (West)

League table (East)

Top goalscorers
Updated through matches played on 1. June 2015.

See also
2014–15 Slovak First Football League
2014–15 3. Liga (Slovakia)

Stats 
 List of transfers summer 2014

References

2014-15
2014–15 in European second tier association football leagues
2